Anatsabites is a monospecific genus of ammonoid cephalopods belonging to the Paragastrioceratidae family. The only species is Anatsabites multiliratus (Plummer & Scott, 1937), formerly placed into genus Paraceltites. Its fossils were found in Wordian (Permian) of Texas.

References

Atsabitidae
Goniatitida genera